The 1931 National Challenge Cup was the annual open cup held by the United States Football Association now known as the Lamar Hunt U.S. Open Cup.

History
By the spring of 1931, the twin ravages of the Great Depression and the "Soccer Wars" had taken their toll on the American Soccer League. As a result, Sam Mark moved his Fall River Marksmen to New York, hoping that a new market there would be more lucrative. Once there he merged the club with New York Soccer Club and renamed them the New York Yankees. Before the merger was finalised, however, Fall River Marksmen had entered the National Challenge Cup and Mark was unable to re-register them as the Yankees. As a result, the Spring 1931 season saw them continue to play in the Challenge Cup as the Fall River Marksmen while at the same time playing as the New York Yankees in the ASL. While the Yankees only managed to finish third in the ASL, the Marksmen won the cup. Largely on the goalscoring strength of Billy Gonsalves, with 9, and Bert Patenaude, with 13, they reached the final where they eventually beat Chicago Bricklayers in a final played as a three-game series. The last of these three games is officially regarded as the last game the Marksmen ever played. The first leg of the final was played on April 5 at the Polo Grounds, where the Marksmen won 6–2, and seemingly established a clear lead. Patenaude scored five goals in that game while Bill McPherson added the other. A week later at Mills Stadium in Chicago, the Bricklayers kept the series alive by earning a 1–1 draw. This time Gonsalves got on the score sheet. Sparta Stadium in Chicago attracted 4,500 for the deciding game on April 19.  The Marksmen could only field 10 players after their captain, Alex McNab, broke his arm in a midweek friendly and the club had neglected to bring along any reserves.  Despite this they still managed to win 2–0 with goals from Patenaude and Gordon Burness.

The Marksmen were not the only club to relocate, merge or disappear. This has made it difficult to follow the teams as they progressed through this year's competition.  To muddy the waters more, the Providence Gold Bugs had been bought by a group of Fall River businessmen and moved to that city to replace the Marksmen.  The Gold Bugs were then renamed Fall River F.C.  Furthermore, after the Gold Bugs had moved to Fall River to become Fall River F.C., it merged with the New Bedford Whalers.  As these teams had all played initial Challenge Cup games, the results become difficult to follow.

Eastern Division

Western Division

Round Robin groups for Quarterfinal qualifying.

Final

First game

Second game

Second game (replay)

Sources

 1931 U.S. Open Cup Results

References

U.S. Open Cup
Nat
Fall River Marksmen